The 2019 Albanian Cup Final was a football match played on 2 June 2019 to decide the winner of the 2018–19 Albanian Cup, the 67th edition of Albania's primary football cup.

The match was played between Kukësi and Tirana at the Elbasan Arena in Elbasan.

Kukësi won the match 2-1, their second time winning the Albanian Cup.

Match

Details

References

Cup Final
2019
Albanian Cup
Football in Elbasan
2010s in Elbasan
Sports competitions in Elbasan
Albanian Cup Final, 2019
Albanian Cup Final, 2019